Following his election as President of South Africa in the 2009 general election, Jacob Zuma announced his first cabinet on 10 May 2009. There were a total of 34 ministerial portfolios in the cabinet.

On 31 October 2010, President Zuma announced a reshuffle in which two ministers were reassigned, seven were replaced, and seventeen new deputy ministers were appointed.

On 24 October 2011, two ministers were removed, two were reassigned to new portfolios, two deputy ministers were promoted to ministers, two deputy ministers were reassigned, and two new deputy ministers were appointed.

On 9 July 2013, President Jacob Zuma fired Minister of Communications Dina Pule because of irregular spending activities. She was replaced by Yunus Carrim, the former Deputy Minister of Cooperative Governance and Traditional Affairs. Zuma also relieved Minister of Human Settlements Tokyo Sexwale, replacing him with Connie September. The Minister of Cooperative Governance and Traditional Affairs Richard Baloyi was replaced by Lechesa Tsenoli. Dipuo Peters Minister of Energy and Ben Martins Minister of Transport  swapped portfolios. A number of Deputy Ministers were also re-appointed to different ministries, including Andries Nel, John Jeffery, Pamela Tshwete and Michael Masutha. Apart from Pieter Mulder of the Freedom Front Plus, all ministers are members of the governing African National Congress or its alliance partner the South African Communist Party.

Ministers

References

Government of South Africa
Executive branch of the government of South Africa
Cabinets of South Africa
2009 establishments in South Africa
2014 disestablishments in South Africa
Cabinets established in 2009
Cabinets disestablished in 2014